Naam Iruvar may refer to:
 Naam Iruvar (1947 film), an Indian Tamil-language drama film
 Naam Iruvar (1985 film), an Indian Tamil-language film